Brown on Resolution (US title: Born for Glory; UK re-issue title: Forever England) is a 1935 film adaptation of the 1929 C. S. Forester novel Brown on Resolution, with John Mills in his first lead role playing the title role. The film is also notable for being the first film to use actual Royal Navy ships. The plot is centred on the illegitimate son of a British naval officer helping to bring about the downfall of a German cruiser during World War I.

The novel was also later adapted as Sailor of the King (also titled Single-Handed in the US, and sometimes – though rarely – Brown on Resolution), in 1953.  The 1935 version retains the novel's original World War I setting, but in the 1953 remake, the setting is realistically updated to the Second World War, as the Germans resumed commerce raiding with surface warships in 1939.

Plot
In 1893, Betty Brown meets a debonair young naval officer and falls in love with him as they have a brief affair, until he has to rejoin his ship. But as they part, Betty tells him they can never meet again because they are from different social classes, so he gives her a prized watch which is a family heirloom. Later, Betty discovers she is pregnant, but she conceals the pregnancy from him. She gives birth to a boy, Albert Brown, and raises him. He joins the navy as soon as he is old enough.

Brown's ship, HMS Rutland, is posted to the Pacific, where in port they encounter and socialize with the crew of a German battlecruiser, the SMS Zeithen. Shortly afterwards, the First World War begins, and at sea Rutland again encounters the much more powerful Zeithen, which it had been shadowing until a British battlecruiser, HMS Leopard, could rendezvous with it so they could attack it together. Rutland is sunk, and Brown and a shipmate are rescued and taken prisoner aboard Zeithen. However, Rutland had succeeded in damaging Zeithen, so its captain plans to pull into an isolated Pacific anchorage to repair the vessel. There, the resourceful Brown escapes, steals a rifle and a small amount of ammunition, and makes his way ashore to the remote Galápagos island of Resolution. From there, he picks off exposed crewmen trying to repair the punctured hull plates on Zeithen, hoping to delay it until Leopard arrives.

Zeithen'''s main battery bombards the island but Brown is able to hide in the rocks. A shore party is sent to the island and Brown is eventually hit by a German shot, from which he later dies, never learning that his actions did delay the repairs long enough for Leopard to arrive and destroy Zeithen in an exchange of fire. The German captain is taken prisoner and reveals what delayed him, and Brown's body and belongings are recovered. His body is buried there, and the British erect a cross on the highest point on the island to commemorate him. The commander of Leopard sees among Brown's belongings the watch he had given to Betty.

Cast
Betty Balfour – Elizabeth Brown
John Mills – Albert Brown
Barry MacKay – Lt. Somerville
Jimmy Hanley – Ginger
Howard Marion-Crawford – Max
H. G. Stoker –  Captain Holt
Percy Walsh – Kapitan von Lutz
George Merritt – William Brown
Cyril Smith – William Brown, Jr.
Charles Childerstone - uncredited

Production
In July 1933 Gaumont British announced they would make a film of the novel. Production was delayed as the studio negotiated with the Admiralty for co operation. In November the studio announced it would make the film as part of their next line up of projects. In January 1934 Walter Forde was announced as director.

By June 1934 the film had still not been made. The Admiralty had given some indication they would co operate, but William Fisher, Commander of the Mediterranean Fleet, was unhappy at the thought of British sailors playing Germans in the film, thinking it would be bad for morale.

In July Gaumont announced the role of the mother would be played by Betty Balfour, a silent film star who had recently made a comeback in Evergreen.

In October the Admiralty agreed to cooperate. The "German raider Zeithen" was played by British   which sank after a collision with RMS Queen Mary, 2 October 1942; "Second-class cruiser HMS Rutland" was played by destroyer leader  which sank after receiving shore battery fire in Algiers, 8 November 1942, and "Armoured Cruiser HMS Leopard" by the new   which was sunk 19 December 1941 by mines off Tripoli (29.31.53).  This was the first time that the Royal Navy had co-operated with a film company to this extent (though Sergei Eisenstein had had the use of Soviet Russian naval vessels for his film Battleship Potemkin in 1925).

The battleship Iron Duke would be filmed at Portsmouth; the Curacoa at Mullion Cove Cornwall; the cruiser Neptune at Invergordon and at sea; Broke and the flotilla would be shot at sea. The Admiralty also allowed filming at the Gunnery School, Whale Island and the Boys Training Establishment at Gosport. Filming began in Portsmouth. John Mills, who had been in Britannia of Billingsgate was cast in the lead. His friend was played by Jimmy Hanley. Studio filming took place at Shepherd's Bush.

The cast included war hero Henry Hugh Gordon Stoker. He had been in a production of Journey's End with Mills.

At one stage the title of the film was going to be "Forever England" based on a line from the Rupert Brooke poem "The Soldier". It was feared that "Brown on Resolution" might be too confusing. But this was the title eventually used.

The film was shown privately to King George V.

Reception
The New York Times'' called it "good hearty entertainment in the Rover Boy tradition."

Notes

External links

1935 films
1930s war adventure films
British war adventure films
Films directed by Walter Forde
World War I naval films
Films set in 1893
Films set in 1914
Films set in London
Films set in Oceania
Films based on British novels
Films based on military novels
Films based on works by C. S. Forester
Films about the Royal Navy
British black-and-white films
1930s British films
1930s English-language films